Markus Schatte (born 22 June 1956 in Frankfurt) is a German football coach.

Schatte originally studied sports science before taking up the teaching profession. Although never having played football professionally, he became the youth trainer and scout for Tennis Borussia Berlin in the late 1980s where he later coached the Boateng brothers, Jérôme and Kevin, as well as Ashkan Dejagah, Zafer Yelen and Sejad Salihović.

For a short time in 2006, Schatte was the first team manager of the Berliner football club Hertha Zehlendorf, and took over the reins at Tennis Borussia Berlin after Johann Gajda was sacked in 2008. He remained at Tennis Borussia as the club's youth team coach before again becoming first team manager following Cemal Yıldız's resignation in April 2011. After being released in 2014, Schatte became manager of Berliner FC Dynamo's reserve team.

Schatte is married and has two sons.

References 

1956 births
Living people
Sportspeople from Frankfurt
German football managers
Tennis Borussia Berlin managers